This is a list of best selling singles in Spain, some of which have been certified by the Productores de Música de España (PROMUSICAE). All of these singles have multi-platinum certifications.

Records 

Ordered by highest-selling to lowest selling within table sections and by alphabetical order within list sections.

Over 500,000 copies

Over 400,000 copies

Over 300,000 copies

Over 200,000 copies

Over 100,000 copies

See also 
 Productores de Música de España
 List of best-selling albums in Spain
 List of best-selling singles

References

External links 
 website

Singles, best-selling
Spain
Spanish music